Uniontown Speedway was a wooden board track in Hopwood, near Uniontown, Pennsylvania.  The track was built in 1916, after the Summit Mountain Hill Climbs were outlawed, and held its final race in June 1922.  The May/June race was known as the Universal Trophy, so named because Carl Laemmle, president of Universal Films, had sponsored the $3,000, solid silver trophy.  Laemmle's company filmed each race, playing them at local theaters. Two National Championship races were held at Uniontown, in 1921 and 1922.

History 
Motorsport was extremely dangerous in the days of the board tracks, but the inaugural race at Uniontown on December 2, 1916 was an especially bloody event, even for the standards of the day.  Two were killed (a driver and his riding mechanic) during practice a few days prior, and five (two spectators and three participants) died during the race.

A second Uniontown Speedway, adjacent to the original site, was active in 1946, as a half-mile (.805 km) dirt track.  It held a National Championship-level sprint car race won by Ted Horn.

AAA Championship Car results
Non-championship races in italics

 Shared drive

See also 
Beverly Hills Speedway
Tacoma Speedway
AAA Contest Board
American Championship car racing

References

External links
Uniontown Speedway at the GEL Motorsport Information Page

Sports venues completed in 1916
Motorsport venues in Pennsylvania
Defunct motorsport venues in the United States
Uniontown, Pennsylvania
1916 establishments in Pennsylvania
1922 disestablishments in Pennsylvania